The Parthian, or Arsacid, monarchs were the rulers of Iran from their victories against the Hellenistic Seleucid Empire in the 140s BC (although they had ruled a smaller kingdom in the region of Parthia for roughly a century at that point, founded by Arsaces I) until the defeat of the last Parthian king, Artabanus IV, at the Battle of Hormozdgan in AD 224. At the height of their power, the Parthian kings ruled an empire stretching from present-day central-eastern Turkey to present-day Afghanistan and western Pakistan.

Chronology of Parthian kings 

The rough sequence of Parthian rulers is relatively well-established from surviving literary sources and traditions, especially histories and accounts written by Roman historians, but many uncertainties exist in terms of the details. The modern understanding of the chronology and sequence of the Parthian rulers is based on surviving sources, but also on information that can be gleaned from Parthian coins, such as dates and the names of kings, which has to be reconciled with what is known from literary sources. One of the largest problems with coin analyses is that coins, especially from the earlier centuries, often give no indication as to who the king depicted is, a problem that is compounded by the lack of dates on many of the coins and the fact that all Parthian kings bore the regnal name Arsaces, which effectively was more similar to an official title, such as the Roman Caesar, than a name. The practice of all Parthian kings assuming Arsaces as their regnal name complicates establishing a chronology of rulers. 

An important foundation in terms of coin studies was David Sellwood's 1971 An Introduction to the Coinage of Parthia, which (through its later editions) remains the primary mainstream basis for determining the sequence of Parthian kings. Because of the aforementioned problems with the coins giving relatively little information, Sellwood's conclusions in regards to genealogy, and in cases the sequence of rulers, was in some cases drawn only on the iconography of the coins themselves. Thus, though it remains the most widely used basis for assigning Parthian coins, Sellwood's interpretations have not gone unchallenged and alternate views exist in regards to not only dates and genealogy, but to the existence or non-existence of certain kings. Among the alternate interpretations, notable work has been conducted by researcher Gholamreza F. Assar, who has proposed alternate interpretations of many coins, resulting in an alternate, "revised", chronology of Parthian rulers. As several historians, for instance Overtoom (2020), as well as dealers of ancient coins, have taken to Assar's interpretation, rather than Sellwood's, some designations of kings are bound to lead to confusion given that certain designations are used for different kings depending on the chronology used. For instance, the king referred to as Mithridates IV by Assar is referred to as Mithridates III by Sellwood, a designation Assar uses for a completely different king. Many historians also continue to doubt Assar's chronology, preferring Sellwood's sequence of kings and dates. Some authors, for instance Ellerbrock (2021), have in their accounts of Parthian chronology chosen to represent both Sellwood's and Assar's reconstructions as equally likely views.

List of kings 
This list includes the regnal dates for the kings, as proposed by both Sellwood and Assar, per Ellerbrock (2021). The chronologies proposed by Touraj Daryaee (2012) and Edward Dąbrowa (2012) are also included. All dates are approximate.

Notes

References

Bibliography 
 

 

 

 
Iran history-related lists
Persia